James Speed (March 11, 1812 – June 25, 1887) was an American lawyer, politician, and professor who was in 1864 appointed by Abraham Lincoln to be the United States Attorney General. Speed previously served in the Kentucky legislature and in local political offices.

Early life
Speed was born in Jefferson County, Kentucky to Judge John Speed and his second wife, Lucy Gilmer Fry. He was a distant descendant of the English cartographer John Speed and brother of Joshua Fry Speed. He graduated from St. Joseph's College in Bardstown, Kentucky, studied law at Transylvania University and was admitted to the bar at Louisville, in 1833.

Career
In 1841 Speed met fellow lawyer and future President Abraham Lincoln while Lincoln was staying at Farmington, the Speed family home in Louisville, while visiting James's brother, Joshua (whom he had befriended while the two lived in Springfield, Illinois). During Lincoln's stay, the two lawyers met almost daily to discuss legal matters of the day. James Speed lent Lincoln books from his law library.

Unlike his brother Joshua, James Speed opposed slavery and was active in the Whig Party. In 1847 Speed was elected to the Kentucky House of Representatives. At this early point in his career, Speed was already agitating for the emancipation of American slaves. However, Kentucky voters did not share views, and he failed to win election as delegate to the 1849 Kentucky Constitutional Convention.

From 1851 to 1854, Speed served on the Louisville Board of Aldermen, including two years as its president. He taught as a professor in the Law Department of the University of Louisville from 1856 to 1858, and would later return to teach from 1872 to 1879. He was one of the founders of the law firm of Stites & Harbison.

Civil War era
As the coming Civil War was increasing in likelihood, Speed worked to keep Kentucky in the Union. He also became a commander of the Louisville Home Guard. Elected to the Kentucky Senate in 1861, Speed became the leader of the pro-Union forces. In 1862 he introduced a bill to "confiscate the property" of those supporting the Confederacy in Kentucky.

In December 1864, United States President Abraham Lincoln appointed Speed Attorney General of the United States. After Lincoln's assassination, Speed became increasingly associated with the Radical Republicans and advocated allowing male African Americans to vote. Disillusioned with the increasingly conservative policies of former Democratic President Andrew Johnson, Speed resigned from the Cabinet in July 1866 and resumed the practice of law.

Postwar career
Speed was a delegate to the National Union Convention in Philadelphia in 1866 and fellow delegates chose him as the convention's president. However, Speed's racial views were unpopular in Kentucky. Speed ran to become U.S. Senator from Kentucky in 1867, as President Johnson's ally Senator James Guthrie (a Unionist and former slaveholder) retired citing health issues. However, voters instead elected Democrat Thomas C. McCreery.

In 1868, Speed ran for the Republican nomination for Vice President of the United States but the convention instead chose Schuyler Colfax.

Speed also ran for U.S. Representative from Kentucky's 5th District in 1870, to succeed Democrat Asa Grover, who had been accused of disloyalty but was exonerated and finished his only term. However, voters instead selected Democrat Boyd Winchester to fill the seat. Speed also was a delegate to Republican National Convention from Kentucky in 1872.

He was elected a 3rd class companion of the Military Order of the Loyal Legion of the United States in recognition of his service to the Union during the Civil War.

Death and legacy
Speed died in Louisville in 1887, and is interred at Cave Hill Cemetery in that city. His family's estate, Farmington, is now listed on the National Register of Historic Places, and while the farm is substantially reduced in size, the house has been restored and has become a local event venue, and the focus of living history events.

In popular culture
Speed was portrayed by William von Hardenburg in the 1924 film The Dramatic Life of Abraham Lincoln.
The actor John Lescault portrayed Speed in the 1998 television film The Day Lincoln Was Shot.
In the 2012 film Lincoln, James Speed was portrayed by Richard Topol.

See also
Farmington Historic Plantation
List of people from the Louisville metropolitan area
Louisville in the American Civil War

References

Further reading

External links

 Mr. Lincoln's White House: James Speed Biography
 "Joshua and James Speed" — Article by Civil War historian/author Bryan S. Bush
 

1812 births
1887 deaths
American abolitionists
Kentucky state senators
Louisville, Kentucky, in the American Civil War
Members of the Kentucky House of Representatives
Politicians from Louisville, Kentucky
People of Kentucky in the American Civil War
Union (American Civil War) political leaders
United States Attorneys General
University of Louisville faculty
Transylvania University alumni
Kentucky lawyers
Burials at Cave Hill Cemetery
Kentucky Whigs
19th-century American politicians
Kentucky Republicans
Lincoln administration cabinet members
Andrew Johnson administration cabinet members
Southern Unionists in the American Civil War